Constitution of 1948 may refer to:

1948 Constitution of Czechoslovakia
1948 Constitution of Romania